The Killing Gods is the fifth studio album by American death metal band Misery Index. It was released on May 23, 2014, by Season of Mist. The first five tracks of the album are all part of one collective song called "Faust".

Reception

Adrien Begrand wrote for Decibel that Misery Index's "hybrid of death metal and grindcore hasn't lost a step at all". He praised the album's "taut and aggressive" music, along with its "clever use of melody" and Jason Netherton's "commanding vocals". Bradley Zorgdrager of Exclaim! said that Misery Index have "focused their craft", and found that the band "proudly embraces" melody on this album. He described the album as "unrelentingly fast, unabashedly heavy and unequivocally the best album yet from an already great band." Sammi Chichester of Revolver described how, during the opening suite of songs, Misery Index "split their blast beats with emotionally-driven breakdowns and melodic guitar solos". She also said the album "might initially irk diehards, but should ultimately leave them far from miserable".

Track listing

Personnel

Misery Index
Jason Netherton – bass guitar, lead and backing vocals
Mark Kloeppel – guitar, lead vocals
Adam Jarvis – drums
Darin Morris – lead guitar

Additional musicians
John Gallagher – guitar solo on "Colony Collapse"

Production
Steve Wright – engineering
Scott Hull – recording
Darin Morris – recording assistance
Drew Lamond – production assistance
Tony Eichler – mastering
Gary Ronaldson – artwork, design, layout
Josh Sisk – photography

References

Misery Index (band) albums
2014 albums
Season of Mist albums